The  was an infantry division in the Imperial Japanese Army. Its call sign was the .It was created July 6 1944 in Himeji. It was a triangular division. The divisional backbone was the 54th Division headquarters.

The 84th Division was assigned to the Central District Army upon formation. In the late 1944, the division was considered for sending to Okinawa, but the 62nd Division was selected instead.

In April 1945, the 84th Division was assigned to the 53rd Army, taking a positions in Odawara, Kanagawa. The division then spent the time building a fortifications until being demobilized in September 1945, after the surrender of Japan.

References and further reading

 Madej, W. Victor. Japanese Armed Forces Order of Battle, 1937-1945 [2 vols] Allentown, Pennsylvania: 1981
This article incorporates material from the article 第84師団 (日本軍) in the Japanese Wikipedia, retrieved on 21 June 2016.

See also
 List of Japanese Infantry Divisions

Japanese World War II divisions
Infantry divisions of Japan
Military units and formations established in 1944
Military units and formations disestablished in 1945
1944 establishments in Japan
1945 disestablishments in Japan